Jill Forster (born 1936), is an English Australian actress who came to Australia as a model in 1964 and appeared in the Crawford Production series Hunter. She is well known for appearances in TV series, but has also appeared in made-for-TV films. She has primarily appeared in small cameo roles, although she is well known as Helen Sheriden in Number 96, replacing original actress Carmen Duncan, and has also had prominent roles in The Restless Years and SeaChange. 

Forster has been in numerous other Australian television dramas, including Motel, The Box, Starting Out, Prisoner, A Country Practice, The Flying Doctors and The Power, The Passion.  She also acted in the hit sex-comedy film Alvin Purple (1973).

Forster married actor and frequent co-star John Stanton in the mid-1970s. They acted together in the TV series Homicide, The Box and Bellamy.

Awards

Filmography (selected)

Film

Television

External links
 
 

1936 births
Living people
AACTA Award winners
Australian television actresses